Syncola is a genus of moths in the family Blastobasidae. There are few important species which are enemies of lac insects. Recently, in 2022 (Online publication) Syncola crypsimorpha and Syncola pulverea have been recorded as pests of lac insects in India(Mahesh, et al.,2022 ).

It contains the single species Syncola epaphria, which is found in Sri Lanka.

References

Blastobasidae genera
Monotypic moth genera
Moths of Asia